Mutant Swinger from Mars is a 2009 Comic science fiction film written, produced and directed by Michael Kallio. The film features Jack White of The White Stripes, The Raconteurs and The Dead Weather. Shot in 1998 and completed in 2009, it made its world premiere at San Diego Comic Con on July 25, 2009. The film's Los Angeles premiere was at Screamfest 2009 on October 24, at Grauman's Mann Chinese 6 theaters.

Synopsis
A "long lost sci-fi film" from the 1950s, finally, has been recovered. Aliens from Mars come to Earth and force a mad scientist to create a "chick magnet" to lure women so they may take them to Mars.

External links

2009 films
2000s comedy horror films
2000s science fiction comedy films
American comedy horror films
American science fiction comedy films
Mars in film
Jack White
2009 comedy films
2000s American films